Einar Frogner (19 May 1893 – 10 July 1955) was the leader of the Norwegian Agrarian Party 1948–1954, and Minister of Agriculture in 1945 in the Unification Cabinet of Einar Gerhardsen. Frogner was a farmer by profession.

References

1893 births
1955 deaths
Ministers of Agriculture and Food of Norway
Members of the Storting
Centre Party (Norway) politicians
20th-century Norwegian politicians